Boris Knyazev (1 July 1900 in Saint Petersburg, Russian Empire – 7 October 1975 in Paris) was a Russian ballet dancer and choreographer.

Biography
Boris Knyazev was born July 1, 1900, Saint Petersburg, Russian Empire. He studied at the St. Petersburg Theater School from 1914 to 1917, class of Kasyan Goleizovsky and Mikhail Mordkin. He left Russia after The 1917 Revolution. At first he lived in Bulgaria, then in 1924 he moved to Paris. He was married to the  ballerina Olga Spesivtseva. Together, they opened a ballet studio, but after some time they parted.

In 1937 he opened his own ballet school in Paris, and in 1953 one in Lausanne; he taught in Athens and Rome, and led the International Academy of Dance in Geneva.

Boris Knyazev was an excellent teacher. He taught Zizi, Roland Petit, Yvette Chauvire and even Brigitte Bardot.

Boris Knyazev's school is based on two assumptions: en dedans (socks and knees facing each other) and en dehors (deployed outside). Knyazev was the first who paid equal attention to these exercises. He enforced in his school the main rule - a daily exercise has to include and en dedans, and en dehors. He was a founder of ballet exercises on the floor - barre au sol.

One of his followers is Stella Voskovetskaya, a Vaganova Academy graduate, who took the best of Knyazev barre au sol, and incorporated it into the best and most advanced system of ballet training, the Vaganova system.

Stella Voskovetskaya founded the Classical Ballet School in Chicago where she works with pre-professional ballet dancers and rhythmic gymnasts.

Boris Knyazev died October 7, 1975, in Paris, France.

Bibliography
Boris Kniaseff. 25 années de Danse 1918—1943. Paris. 1943.

1900 births
1975 deaths
Dancers from Saint Petersburg
Russian male ballet dancers
20th-century Russian ballet dancers
White Russian emigrants to France